"Invasion" is the first single from the band Eisley's 2007 album, Combinations.

Inspiration 

During the band's Final Noise Tour in 2006 Sherri DuPree would ask the crowd if they had read or watched Invasion of the Body Snatchers, and then the band would play this song. DuPree said that they received the book as a gift, which in turn inspired them to write the song.

Video

There were to be two videos shot for Invasion. The first, a more "viral version", was shot in two days in Tyler, Texas and was directed by Miranda Penn. The second was given up on after assumed conflict with Warner Brothers.

External links
SXSW 2007 Video Performance of Invasion

Eisley songs
2007 songs